Berkovo is a rural locality (a village) in Dvinitskoye Rural Settlement, Sokolsky District, Vologda Oblast, Russia. The population was 10 as of 2002.

Geography 
Berkovo is located 52 km northeast of Sokol (the district's administrative centre) by road. Naumovskoye is the nearest rural locality.

References 

Rural localities in Sokolsky District, Vologda Oblast